Climbing Japan Cup or Japan Climbing Cup is a series of climbing competitions held annually and organized by the JMSCA (Japan Mountaineering and Sport Climbing Association). The athletes compete in three disciplines: lead, bouldering and speed. The first Lead Japan Cup was held in 1987. The first Bouldering Japan Cup was held in 2005. The first Combined Japan Cup was held in 2018. The first Speed Japan Cup was held in 2019.

Lead 
Lead Japan Cup (in Japanese)

Bouldering 
Bouldering Japan Cup (in Japanese)

Akiyo Noguchi won the most, with 9 consecutive wins from 2005 to 2014 (1st-9th). In 2017, Futaba Ito then 14-year-old, became the youngest athlete to win the Bouldering Japan Cup. There were no male athletes who won more than once until Kokoro Fujii won three times consecutively from 2016 to 2018 and then again in 2021.

Speed 
Speed Japan Cup (in Japanese)

Combined 
Combined Japan Cup (in Japanese)

References

External links 
 www.jma-climbing.org (JMSCA website for Events, Competitions and Calendar/Results)
 JMSCA (Japan Mountaineering and Sport Climbing Association)
 JMSCA Youtube channel

 
Climbing competitions